Denson Springs is an unincorporated community in Anderson County, in the U.S. state of Texas. According to the Handbook of Texas, the community had a population of 100 in 2000. It is a part of the Palestine, Texas micropolitan area.

History
This area, originally called Ioni after a nearby native village, was granted to James Bradshaw in 1835. Upon his death in 1844, it was inherited by his brother, William Bradshaw, whose family arrived in 1849. In 1878, the growing community was renamed after William's daughter, Nancy Anne Denson, widow of William Denson. A post office was established at Denson Springs in 1893, and remained in operation until 1918. In 1896, the community only had a general store run by Wortham and Company, and then expanded to have 3 businesses, a doctor's office, a cotton gin and mill, and a church 5 years later. It had a population of 100 residents in 1914, as well as two general stores and a cotton gin. Several scattered homes were located in Denson Springs in 1936. In 1982, the community had only a cemetery and a few scattered houses in the area. It had an estimated population of 100 in 2000.

Geography

Education
The community's first school, called Grayson School, was located on the "old Grayson place". It was one of the largest schools in Anderson County before the American Civil War, and the schoolhouse was also used as a Baptist church. It moved into Denson Springs in 1887 and remained until well after 1936. In 1934, it had two teachers and 46 students. In 1955, the community's school was joined up with the Slocum Independent School District.

Notes

References

Unincorporated communities in Anderson County, Texas
Unincorporated communities in Texas